Ilias Panagiotaros (born 1973) is a former member of the Hellenic Parliament, representing Golden Dawn and was later tried and convicted of belonging to a criminal organization. In September 2013, Panagiotaros was arrested along with four other Golden Dawn MPs as part of a police investigation of the murder of Pavlos Fyssas, which Golden Dawn was accused of being involved in. Panagiotaros was charged in court and stood accused of being a member of a criminal organization.

In April 2014, Panagiotaros described Hitler as a "great personality, like Stalin" and denounced homosexuality as a "sickness". Panagiotaros also described most Muslim immigrants to Greece as, "Jihadists; fanatic Muslims" and claimed that he supported the concept of a one-race nation, stating, "if you are talking about nation, it is one race."

References

External links
 

Living people
Greek neo-Nazis
Golden Dawn (political party) politicians
Greek MPs 2012 (May)
Greek MPs 2012–2014
Greek MPs 2015 (February–August)
Greek MPs 2015–2019
Year of birth missing (living people)
Politicians from Athens